South Pacific [SOPAC] Combat Air Transport Command (SCAT) was a joint command of US military logistics units in the Pacific Ocean theater of World War II. It contributed notably to the success of U.S. forces in the battles for Guadalcanal (1942–1943), New Georgia (1943), and Bougainville (1943–1945), as well as the Allied air campaign against Rabaul.

History
The organization of SCAT was a response to developments on Guadalcanal, following the initial deployment of Marine Aircraft Group 25 in September 1942, comprising the United States Marine Corps transport squadron VMJ-253 and Headquarters Squadron, MAG-25, which were soon joined by the 13th Troop Carrier Squadron, United States Army Air Forces (USAAF).  SCAT was formally organized around MAG-25 in late November 1942 at the direction of VAdm. Aubrey Fitch, and by the end of the Guadalcanal campaign it included VMJ-152 and SMS-25 of the Marine Corps and the USAAF 801st Medical Air Evacuation Squadron.  In 1943 SCAT was joined by VMJ-153 and the USAAF 403rd Troop Carrier Group (including the 64th Troop Carrier Squadron and 63rd Troop Carrier Squadron).

SCAT provided rapid transport of personnel and cargo, including munitions, food, replacement parts, and medical supplies, to and from forward areas.  On rearward flights SCAT frequently provided aeromedical evacuation of wounded or sick personnel.  Aircraft typically included a flight nurse, corpsman, or flight surgeon as part of the crew. SOPAC Combat Air Transport Command was dissolved as its Army Air Forces troop carrier units departed in July 1944, although the Marines adopted the organizational title Solomons Combat Air Transport Command and continued to utilize the "SCAT" acronym.

MAG-25, including the attached 13th Troop Carrier Squadron, was awarded the Distinguished Unit Citation as part of the 1st Marine Division (Reinforced) for the Guadalcanal Campaign.  SCAT received a Navy Unit Commendation for its operations in the South Pacific from December 1942 to July 1944.

The nickname "Flying Boxcars" was widely used for the Douglas R4D aircraft flown by Marine Corps units in SCAT, predating its attachment to the post-war Fairchild C-119 Flying Boxcar (R4Q) aircraft.

Personnel
Notable persons who had been associated with SCAT include:
 Richard Nixon, 37th President of the United States, who served as officer-in-charge of SCAT forward detachments at Bougainville and Green Island while assigned to Headquarters Squadron-25. 
 David Douglas Duncan, photographer, who covered SCAT while assigned to VMD-154.
 William K. Lanman, executive officer of VMJ-153 and then MAG-25, who became a millionaire benefactor of Yale University.

See also

 List of inactive United States Marine Corps aircraft squadrons
 United States Marine Corps Aviation

References

Notes

Bibliography
Armstrong, William. (2017). Marine Air Group 25 and SCAT (Images of Aviation). Arcadia. .
Page, Evelyn, ed. (1989). The Story of Air Evacuation, 1942-1989. Taylor Publishing Company.
Sherrod, Robert. (1952). History of Marine Corps Aviation in World War II. Combat Forces Press. .
Washburne, Seth. (2011). The Thirsty 13th: The U.S. Army Air Forces 13th Troop Carrier Squadron, 1940 - 1945. Thirsty 13th LLC. .

Further reading
 Capt. Robert Joseph Allen and 1st Lt. Otis Carney, The Story of SCAT: Part I and The Story of SCAT: Part II, in Air Transport magazine, December 1944 and January 1945, accessed at The DC3 Aviation Museum  and  2 August 2006
 Capt. John M. Rentz, Marines in the Central Solomons (Ch.6, The Role of Aviation: pp. 141–145), USMC Monograph accessed at  2 August 2006
  Maj. Gen. Norman J. Anderson and Col. William K. Snyder, SCAT, Marine Corps Gazette, September 1992 accessed at  2 August 2006

United States Marine Corps aviation
Joint military units and formations of the United States
Pacific Ocean theatre of World War II
Military units and formations established in 1942
Military units and formations disestablished in 1944